Novikovsky is a rural locality (a khutor) in Sonchinskoye Rural Settlement, Kamensky District, Voronezh Oblast, Russia. The population was 251 as of 2010. There are 5 streets.

Geography 
Novikovsky is located 15 km east of Kamenka (the district's administrative centre) by road. Ivchenkovo is the nearest rural locality.

References 

Rural localities in Kamensky District, Voronezh Oblast